Schuyler may refer to:

Places

United States
 Schuyler County, Illinois
 Schuyler County, Missouri
 Schuyler, Nebraska, a city
 Schuyler County, New York
 Schuyler, New York, a town
 Schuyler Island, Lake Champlain, New York
 Schuyler Creek, Seneca County, New York
 Schuyler, Virginia, a census-designated place
 Fort Schuyler, a 19th-century fortification in the Bronx, New York
 Old Fort Schuyler, a Revolutionary War fort that was located in what is now Utica, New York
 Fort Stanwix, at the location of present-day Rome, New York, captured from the British by American forces in 1776 and renamed Fort Schuyler

Antarctica
 Mount Schuyler, Graham Land

People

 Schuyler (name), a name of Dutch origin, including a list of people with the given name or surname

Ships
 , a cargo ship constructed near the end of World War II

Songs
 The Schuyler Sisters, the fifth song from Act 1 of the musical Hamilton

See also
 Schuler, a surname
 Schuyler Apartments, Spartanburg, South Carolina, United States, on the National Register of Historic Places
 Schuylerville, New York
 Schuyler Falls, New York
 Schuyler Lake, New York
 Skylar (disambiguation)
 Skyler

Dutch-language surnames